Aspergillus griseoaurantiacus is a species of fungus in the genus Aspergillus. It is from the Versicolores section. The species was first described in 2014.

References 

griseoaurantiacus
Fungi described in 2014